Jonathan Asp (born 6 May 1990) is a Swedish footballer who plays as a left back.

References

External links

1990 births
Living people
Association football midfielders
Swedish footballers
Sweden youth international footballers
Sweden under-21 international footballers
Landskrona BoIS players
Trelleborgs FF players
Åtvidabergs FF players
Notodden FK players
Allsvenskan players
Superettan players
Norwegian First Division players
Ettan Fotboll players
Swedish expatriate footballers
Expatriate footballers in Norway
Swedish expatriate sportspeople in Norway
Footballers from Malmö